Sea to Sea or From Sea to Sea may refer to:

 From Sea to Sea, the English translation of the Canadian national motto
 From Sea to Sea and Other Sketches, Letters of Travel, by Rudyard Kipling
 Sea to Sea Cycle Route, a cycle route crossing Northern England
 Sea-to-Sea Route, a proposed hiking trail in the northern United States
A series of Canadian praise and worship compilation albums:
 Sea to Sea: Filled with Your Glory, 2004
 Sea to Sea: I See the Cross, 2005
 Sea to Sea: For Endless Days, 2006

See also
 From C to C: Chinese Canadian Stories of Migration, a 2011 documentary film about Chinese Canadians
 C2C (disambiguation)
 Coast to Coast (disambiguation)